Holyrood is an area in Edinburgh, the capital of Scotland, lying east of the city centre, at the foot of the Royal Mile.

The area originally took its name from Holyrood Abbey, which was the Church of the Holy Rude (Scots for 'Holy Cross').

Holyrood includes the following sites:
 The modern Scottish Parliament Building. For this reason "Holyrood" is often used in contemporary media as a metonym for the Scottish Government.
 The Palace of Holyroodhouse, the official residence of the monarch in Scotland.
 The ruins of Holyrood Abbey
 Holyrood Park, an expansive royal park to the south and east of the palace.
 The Queen's Gallery, part of the Holyroodhouse complex formerly a church and now an art gallery.
 Dynamic Earth, visitor attraction and science centre which is Scotland's largest interactive museum.
 A number of residential, light commercial, and government properties.

References

External links
 Google Maps (showing Holyrood)

Areas of Edinburgh
Royal Mile